Abhinav Deshwal (born 2007) is an Indian deaf sports shooter. He made his Deaflympic debut at the age of 15 representing India at the 2021 Summer Deaflympics. He hails from Roorkee, Uttarakhand.

Career 
He competed at the 2021 Summer Deaflympics and clinched a gold medal in the men's 10m air pistol shooting event. He was initially tied with Ukraine's Oleksii Lazebnyk at 234.2 points apiece at the end of 24-shot final, before securing a gold medal in a shoot-off where he shot 10.3 in contrast to Lazebnyk's 9.7 mark. It was also India's second gold medal in shooting during the 2021 Summer Deaflympics.

References 

2007 births
Living people
Indian male sport shooters
Deaf sport shooters
Indian deaf people
Deaflympic shooters of India
Deaflympic gold medalists for India
Medalists at the 2021 Summer Deaflympics
Shooters at the 2021 Summer Deaflympics
People from Uttarakhand
21st-century Indian people